Lauren Ashley Smith is an American writer, comedian, and producer. She is the head writer of HBO's A Black Lady Sketch Show (2019–), for which she has received three Emmy Award nominations. Smith previously worked for The Rundown with Robin Thede, Best Week Ever, Watch What Happens Live, and Fashion Queens.

Early life and education 
Smith was born and raised in St. Louis, Missouri. She has two sisters, Mariah and Rachel. Her parents, Rochelle and Jonathan, are administrators at Saint Louis University and Washington University in St. Louis. Smith received her bachelor's degree from Dickinson College.

Career 
Smith's writing career started as a freelancer for Best Week Ever, Watch What Happens Live, and Fashion Queens. In 2017, Smith was hired as the head writer for The Rundown with Robin Thede, which ran for one season. Thede later hired Smith again as the head writer and co-executive producer of A Black Lady Sketch Show. Smith is the first Black woman to be a head writer on a TV sketch show. The series debuted in 2019, and Smith received Emmy nominations for Outstanding Variety Sketch Series (2020, 2021) and Outstanding Writing for a Variety Series (2021).

In 2021, it was announced that Smith will create and produce an American reboot of Timewasters, a British time-travel comedy series. The ABC reboot will center four present-day Black New Yorkers who find themselves in the Harlem Renaissance. In August 2021, she signed an overall deal with CBS Studios to create comedy content for the network's broadcast and streaming platforms.

Personal life 
Smith is queer. She married her wife, Brooke Helburn, in 2015.

Filmography

Awards and nominations

For A Black Lady Sketch Show: 
 2020 – Nominee, Primetime Emmy Awards, Outstanding Variety Sketch Series
 2021 – Nominee, Primetime Emmy Awards, Outstanding Writing for a Variety Series
 2021 – Nominee, Primetime Emmy Awards, Outstanding Variety Sketch Series

References

External links 
 Official website
 

Living people
21st-century African-American women writers
21st-century American women writers
21st-century African-American writers
African-American screenwriters
American women screenwriters
Writers from St. Louis
African-American female comedians
American women comedians
Comedians from Missouri
21st-century American screenwriters
American women television writers
Dickinson College alumni
Entertainers from Missouri
American LGBT writers
LGBT producers
American LGBT comedians
LGBT African Americans
LGBT people from Missouri
Year of birth missing (living people)